Cheremukhovo is a rural locality (a village) in Mikhaylovskoye Rural Settlement, Kharovsky District, Vologda Oblast, Russia. The population was 3 as of 2010.

Geography 
Cheremukhovo is located 12 km east of Kharovsk (the district's administrative centre) by road. Popchikha is the nearest rural locality.

References 

Rural localities in Kharovsky District